Karl Joseph Anton Leodegar von Bachmann (3 March 1734 – 3 September 1792) was a Swiss mercenary in French service, best known as the commander of the Swiss Guards during the Insurrection of 10 August 1792.

Family 
Karl Joseph von Bachmann was born in Näfels, Switzerland, to Karl Leonhard von Bachmann and Elisabeth Keller. His father was a mercenary in French service who fought in the Spanish War of Succession and the Austrian War of Succession, rising to the rank of maréchal de camp. His brother was Niklaus Franz von Bachmann.

Military career in France
In 1749 Bachmann entered the French Army as a cadet. He was soon promoted to ensign in his father's company in the Régiment de Castella, and in 1750 was promoted to Captain of the Grenadiers of the same regiment. He became the owner of two of the regiment's companies in 1756, and in 1762 was promoted to major of the Régiment Waldner von Freudenstein. During this period he fought in various engagements of the Seven Years' War.

In 1764, Bachmann joined the Swiss Guards as a lieutenant-colonel. He was promoted to brigadier in 1768, then to maréchal de camp in 1770. He received the Royal and Military Order of Saint Louis in 1778. In 1792, Bachmann he became the owner of a company of the Swiss Guard Regiment.

Insurrection of 10 August 1792
Bachmann was in direct charge of the 900 Swiss Guards present during the Insurrection of 10 August 1792, when French revolutionaries stormed the Tuileries Palace. The nominal commander of the Guard, the elderly Colonel Louis-Auguste-Augustin d'Affry, was in poor health and had delegated Bachmann to bring the regiment into central Paris during the evening of 9 August. Having deployed his Swiss to defend the palace Major Bachmann escorted King Louis XVI and the Royal Family to the National Assembly, where they sought refuge. For reasons that are not clear, Bachmann did not give any instructions to his subordinates left behind in the Tuileries.
 About 650 Swiss Guards were subsequently killed, either during the fighting which broke out spontaneously shortly afterwards, or massacred after surrender.

Arrested by the revolutionaries, Major Bachmann was accused of treason for ordering the Swiss Guard to resist the storming of the royal palace and thereby offending the "Majesty of the People". Bachmann refused to acknowledge the tribunal which was trying him, as the Swiss soldiers in French service were entitled to be tried by their own courts. His trial was interrupted in the late afternoon of 2 September 1792 when the September Massacres of hundreds of political prisoners took place at the Conciergerie and Abbaye prisons. A mob invaded the courtroom where Major Bachmann and other Swiss Guards were being tried before the official Tribunal of 17 August. The crowd retreated when ordered to clear the room by the presiding judges and Bachmann "passed through their shambles unharmed on his way to the scaffold".

Bachmann was then formally sentenced to death, and guillotined on 3 September 1792. He stepped onto the scaffold still wearing the red coat of the Swiss Guard.

The Dying Lion in Lucerne 
Bachmann's name is engraved on the Dying Lion monument in Lucerne, by Bertel Thorvaldsen, where he figures as second on the list of the fallen Swiss Guards.

References

External Links and Sources 

1734 births
1792 deaths
Order of Saint Louis recipients
Swiss mercenaries
People executed by guillotine during the French Revolution
People from the canton of Glarus
Swiss people executed abroad
Karl Joseph